Phyllomenia is a genus of sterrofustian solenogasters, shell-less, worm-like, marine mollusks.

References

Sterrofustia